The 1924 FA Charity Shield was the eleventh staging of the FA Charity Shield, an annual association football match arranged to raise funds for charitable causes supported by the Football Association (the FA), the governing body of football in England. As in the 1923 competition, the match was held between the a team of England professionals and amateurs. In contrast to previous year, the amateurs were reported as giving the professionals a much more competitive game, despite losing 3-1.

The teams played contrasting styles, with the professionals holding onto possession and attempting to open up the game, while the amateurs played a more direct style and "indulged in some good honest old-fashioned shoulder charging." Neither team scored in the first half, with Taylor performing well for the professionals in goal. Walker scored for the professionals after half-time, before an equaliser from Kail. The professionals won with two late goals, first from Buchanan and then Walker.

Match details

References

FA Community Shield
Charity Shield
Charity Shield
Charity Shield